The Bamboo Stroke (French: Le coup de bambou) is a 1963 French comedy film directed by Jean Boyer and starring François Périer, Micheline Presle and Jean Richard. The title is a French expression for something that is painfully expensive.

The film's sets were designed by the art director Robert Giordani.

Synopsis
Following the sale of her bistro, a young woman leaves the money from the transaction in a taxi. In order to avoid her husband's reproaches, she feigns amnesia.

Cast
 François Périer as Léon Brissac
 Micheline Presle as Angèle Brissac
 Jean Richard as Albert
 Noël Roquevert as Dr. Séverin
 Jacques Dufilho as Le chauffeur de taxi
 Jean Lefebvre as L'auvergnat
 Paul Bisciglia		
 Jacques Dynam		
 Claudie Laurence		
 Sophie Mallet		
 Lucienne Marchand	
 Dominique Zardi	
 Léon Zitrone

References

Bibliography 
 Quinlan, David. Quinlan's Illustrated Directory of Film Stars. Batsford, 1996.

External links 
 

1963 films
French comedy films
1963 comedy films
1960s French-language films
Films directed by Jean Boyer
1960s French films